St. Nicholas Church is a Greek Catholic, since 1948 Romanian Orthodox church located at 542 Câmpușorului Street, Orlat, Sibiu County, Romania. It is dedicated to Saint Nicholas.

The church dates to 1794. It is listed as a historic monument by Romania's Ministry of Culture and Religious Affairs.

From 1910 to 1916, writer Ion Agârbiceanu served there as a parish priest, when the church was still Greek Catholic.

Notes

Historic monuments in Sibiu County
Romanian Orthodox churches in Sibiu County
Churches completed in 1794
Former Greek-Catholic churches in Romania